The 2013 UEFA European Under-21 Championship Final was a football match that took place on 18 June 2013 at the Teddy Stadium in Jerusalem, and determined the winner of the 2013 UEFA European Under-21 Championship that hosted in Israel. Spain won their fourth title defeating Italy 4–2. Thiago scored a first half hat-trick for Spain in the final.

Route to the final

Match details

See also
 2013 UEFA European Under-21 Championship squads

References

External links
Official website

Final
UEFA European Under-21 Championship finals
Italy national under-21 football team
Spain national under-21 football team
Sport in Jerusalem
Italy–Spain relations
UEFA
2013 in Jerusalem
June 2013 sports events in Europe